John Robert Leslie (1831 – 1 January 1881) was an Irish academic whose entire career was spent at Trinity College Dublin (TCD), where he was Erasmus Smith's Professor of Natural and Experimental Philosophy (1870–1881).

Life and career
John Robert Leslie was born near Timoleague, Cork, to Rev John Leslie (1804–1838) and his wife Elizabeth Travers (1806?–1886), his father dying when he was young.  He was educated at Drogheda Grammar School, and entered TCD on 1 July 1947, aged 16.  He obtained BA (1852), MA (1856), DD (1862), and was elected a Fellow in 1858.  He served as Erasmus Smith's Professor of Natural and Experimental Philosophy from 1870 until his death..

References

External links
 Burtchaell, G. D., and Sadleir, T. U. (eds), Alumni Dublinensis: A Register of the Students, Graduates, Professors and Provosts of Trinity College in the University of Dublin, 1593–1860 (Dublin, 1935), p. 71

Academics of Trinity College Dublin
Alumni of Trinity College Dublin
Fellows of Trinity College Dublin
Irish mathematicians
1831 births
1881 deaths